Ohad was the third son of Simeon; he is mentioned in Genesis 46:10. 

Ohad may also refer to:


People

Surname
 Daniella Ohad, American design historian

Given name
 Ohad Benchetrit, Canadian musician
 Ohad Cohen, goalkeeper for Hapoel Be'er Sheva F.C.
 Ohad Kadousi, striker for Hapoel Petah Tikva
 Ohad Knoller, Israeli actor
 Ohad Levita, goalkeeper for RKC Waalwijk
 Ohad Maiman, Israeli photographer
 Ohad Milstein, Israeli documentary filmmaker
 Ohad Moskowitz, Israeli singer
 Ohad Naharin, Israeli contemporary dancer
 Ohad Saidof, goalkeeper for Beitar Jerusalem

Places
 Ohad, Israel